Malcolm Gracie "Calum" Semple  is a British physician and academic. He is Professor of Child Health and Outbreak Medicine at the University of Liverpool and a consultant respiratory paediatrician at Alder Hey Children's Hospital Liverpool.

Semple was an undergraduate medical student the Middlesex Hospital Medical School when he met Richard Tedder at the hospital Burns supper, both playing their bagpipes. This led to Semple interrupting his medical studies to read an intercalated bachelor's tripos in cell pathology, immunology and virology supervised by Lewis Wolpert, Ivan Roitt, and Richard Tedder. He continued to study clinical virology as a doctoral student supervised by Richard Tedder and Dr Clive Loveday at University College London. Semple completed his medical degree at Merton College, Oxford.

Semple led a clinical trial of Ebola convalescent plasma in Sierra Leone and a follow-up study of Ebola survivors with Dr Janet T Scott and Paul J Steptoe.

Honours
Semple was awarded the Ebola Medal for Service in West Africa in 2016. He was appointed Officer of the Order of the British Empire (OBE) in the 2020 Birthday Honours for services to the Covid-19 response.

References 

Fellows of the Royal College of Paediatrics and Child Health
Living people
Academics of the University of Liverpool
British paediatricians
West African Ebola virus epidemic
Fellows of the Royal College of Physicians of Edinburgh
Fellows of the Higher Education Academy
Year of birth missing (living people)
Officers of the Order of the British Empire
People educated at Loretto School, Musselburgh